Siedzów  is a village in Otwock County, Gmina Sobienie-Jeziory.The  population is near 350. From 1975 to 1998 village was in Siedlce Voivodeship.

Villages in Otwock County